Brisbane Water was a former government business enterprise of the Brisbane City Council, a local government authority with administrative responsibility for the City of Brisbane, Queensland, in Australia. Brisbane Water was responsible for the distribution of reticulated potable water throughout Brisbane, as well as the treatment and transport of bulk water to the local government areas of Brisbane City, Ipswich City, Logan City, Redcliffe City, Pine Rivers Shire and Caboolture Shire. Brisbane Water operated the city's reticulated sewerage network and associated treatment plants.

On 1 July 2010 the functions of Brisbane Water were formally assumed by the Queensland Urban Utilities, a statutory authority of the Government of Queensland, with shares resting in the local government authorities of Brisbane, Ipswich, Lockyer Valley, Scenic Rim, and Somerset councils.

History
Brisbane Water ceased operating as a business unit of Brisbane Council as part of a restructure introduced by the then Lord Mayor, Campbell Newman. The division was renamed initially as Brisbane City Council - Water Distribution.

On 1 July 2010, Brisbane City Council ceased operating under the Queensland Urban Utilities trademark, with water distribution, and sewerage collection and treatment assets, functions and staff transitioned to the new Queensland Urban Utilities, a distributor-retailer statutory authority jointly owned by five local Councils. Simultaneously, the neighbouring distributor-retailers of UnityWater and AllConnex also commenced operations.

See also

 Queensland Water Commission
 Seqwater
 Water security in Australia
 Water supply and sanitation in Australia

References

External links
Queensland Urban Utilities website

Brisbane
Water companies of Queensland
Water management in Queensland
Australian companies disestablished in 2010